Trio Reynoso also known as "The Kings of Merengue Tipico" are considered to be one of the best musical groups of perico ripiao or merengue tipico. Trio Reynoso was composed of singer/accordionist Pedro Reynoso, percussionist Francisco Esquea, singer and güira player Domingo Reynoso, and marimbero and güirero Antonio Rosario Almonte(chirichito) who is known as one of the best güireros of all time and they laid the foundations of a new local mainstream called bachata-merengue. They were considered the most popular Latin group during the Trujillo and Post-Trujillo era. They became a well-known group in parts of Latin America other than the Dominican Republic such as Cuba and Puerto Rico. After the death of Pedro Reynoso on July 18, 1965, Trio Reynoso had to get a new accordionist and lead singer. In the end, it came out to be Tatico Henriquez, who in 1966, recorded his first song with the group called "Lo Que Tu Me Pidas". Some well notable songs that they have recorded were "Juana Mecho", "El Gallo Floreao", "Canto De Hacha", "Juanita Morel", "Alevántate", "Chanflin", "Mi Mujer De Oro", "Maria Luisa", "El Picoteao" and "La Lisa". Tatico Henriquez would go into the footsteps of Pedro Reynoso and become one of the greatest accordionists of the Merengue Típico genre. He is also the most popular artist of the merengue típico genre that has sold more records than any other artist in the history of Merengue Típico.

In July 2013, the Association of Art Reporters included the "Trío Reynoso con Tatico" album among their collection "100 Essential Albums of Dominican music".

In the Juana Mecho LP, it was a compilation of tipicos that originally was never complete due to the death of Pedro Reynoso. In the end, Side A consisted of six songs by Pedro Reynoso and Side B consisted of Tatico's first six recordings as an accordionist and lead singer in the trio.
For a short amount of time, Joseito Mateo, who is considered to be "The King of Merengue", played the tambora, especially in the Juana Mecho LP of Tatico's first recordings with the group.

Discography

Merengues Trio Reynoso
Mi Mujer de Oro
Adela
Desiderio Arias
Las Tres Muchachas
La Maya Prendia
El Guaba
Guizando
Canto de Hacha
Mi Desengaño
Te Cayo Gas
El Tira y Jala
La Niña Que No Da Amor

15 Exitos de Siempre Con El Original
Juanita Morel
Fiesta
Ay Caramba
El Cafe de Comay Juana
Dolorita
Dolores la Buenamosa
Alevantate
Compadre Pedro Juan
Conformidad
La Subidora
Ta Buen Piquero
Tin Tin Feliciana
La Serrania
La Enrama
La Ligadura

Trio Reynoso Merengues
La Nena
El Chemisse
El Papujito
La Espinita
Virgen de la Altagracia
La Lisa
Baila Conmigo
La Mujer Santa
La Mano de Dios
Matame con tu Cuchilla

Trio Reynoso Cibao Adentro
De Que Es Priva Dolores
Las Flores
El Sinverguenzon
Los Algodones
El Serrucho
Cibao Adentro
El Comisario
Compay Cucu
Hasta El Rio
Juanita Morel
Los Mangos
Cualquiera Va

A Bailar Merengue con el Trio Reynoso
Lucero de la Mañana
Teresita
El Colita Blanca
El Mosquito
El Guava
El Merequeten
Aguardiente Ven 
Conformidad
Oye mi Merengue
Encalacate Conmigo
Le Cojen la Seña
La Justicia

El Chucu Chucu
El Chucu Chucu
Emilio mi Colega
Mingo Gonzalez
El Gallo Floreao
La Gina
Rompe Cabezas
El Picoteao 
Maria Dolores
La Ultima Moda
Mis Tres Amores
Con el Alma
La Vieja Bruja

El Ultimo De Los Reynoso Merengues
La Muerte De Martin
Ay! La Vida
Rosa Se Llamaba
La Carabana
A La Buena De Dios
La 7 Pasadas(Solo Accordion)
La Mamajuana
La Mujer Mas Bella
Recuerdo A Ramona
No Me Llames Por Tu Nombre

Perico Ripiao Con el Original Trio Reynoso Vol. 3 (1958)
El Hombre Marinero
Tolinlanla
La Subidora
Monto Mi Caballo
Ahora Si Hay Melao
Conformidad
Tin Tin Tin "Feliciana"
La Serranía
Ay Mi Dios
Llorar de Amores

Merengue Tradicionales/Juana Mecho
Juana Mecho
Heroina
Picoteao
No Me Importa
San Antonio
Pintalabio
Se Seca La Rama
Lo Que a Mi Me Pasa
Adeyda
Lo Que Tu Pidas
El Mismo Dolor
El Bate Domingo

El Original Trio Reynoso En Su Epoca De Oro
Con el Alma
Puro Cibaeño
Emilio mi Colega
Maria Dolores
Saludos a Miguel
Chanflin
Mis Tres Mujeres
Le voy a dar una pela
Soñe Contigo
Juan Gomero
Las Mercedes
Tirale Bajito

Autentico Merengues Dominicanos Vol.3
De Que Es Que Priva Dolores
Las Flores
El Sinverguenzon
Los Algodones
El Serrucho
Cibao Adentro
El Comisario
Compay Cucu
Hasta El Rio
Juanita Morel
Los Mangos
Por Una Boricua

Conjunto Reynoso en 14 Selecciones Merengue Dominicano LP
Cuidado No Hay Bocina
La Gualetica
Llorar de amores
Maria Luisa
El Pichoncito
El Gallo Floreao
La Vieja Bruja
El Cola Blanca
Emilio Mi Colega
El Biberón
Teresita
Lucero De La Mañana
La Gina
Año Nuevo

References

Dominican Republic musical groups